Philip Hoffman (March 31, 1901 – December 22, 1980) was a Canadian politician who was a Member of Provincial Parliament in Legislative Assembly of Ontario from 1960 to 1963. He represented the riding of  Timiskaming for the Ontario Progressive Conservative Party. Born in Lount Township, Ontario, he was a forest ranger.

References

1901 births
1980 deaths
Progressive Conservative Party of Ontario MPPs